Krzyż may refer to:

Krzyż, Łódź Voivodeship (central Poland)
Krzyż, Pomeranian Voivodeship (north Poland)
Krzyż, Świętokrzyskie Voivodeship (south-central Poland)
Krzyż, Warmian-Masurian Voivodeship (north Poland)
Krzyż Wielkopolski (north western Poland)